Archips abiephage is a species of moth of the family Tortricidae. It is found on the islands of Hokkaido and Honshu in Japan.

The wingspan is 18.5–23.5 mm.

The larvae feed on Abies concolor, Abies sachalinensis and Picea species.

References

Moths described in 1975
Archips
Moths of Japan